Zaza Kedelashvili (Georgian: ზაზა კედელაშვილი; born 12 November 1983) is a Georgian former judoka.

Achievements

External links
 
 
 Videos on Judovision.org

1985 births
Living people
Male judoka from Georgia (country)
Judoka at the 2008 Summer Olympics
Olympic judoka of Georgia (country)
21st-century people from Georgia (country)